New York's 132nd State Assembly district is one of the 150 districts in the New York State Assembly. It has been represented by Phil Palmesano since 2011.

Geography 
District 132 contains a majority of Steuben County, all of Schuyler and Yates counties, and portions of Chemung and Seneca counties.

Recent election results

2022

2020

2018

2016

2014

2012

References

132
Yates County, New York
Steuben County, New York
Schuyler County, New York
Chemung County, New York
Seneca County, New York